Paradisiac is the 2005 album by Belgian rock band Millionaire.

Track listing

Notes
 "Nocturn" appears as a hidden track starting at 8:25 into track 11 on the cd.

Chart positions

References

2005 albums
Millionaire (band) albums